Haisnes is a commune in the Pas-de-Calais department in the Hauts-de-France region of France.

Geography

Population

Places of interest

 The churches of St.Nicaise and St. Elie, both dating from the twentieth century.
 The Commonwealth War Graves Commission cemeteries.

See also
Communes of the Pas-de-Calais department

References

External links

 Official website of Haisnes 
 St.Mary's CWGC cemetery
 Bois-Carré CWGC cemetery

Communes of Pas-de-Calais